Gerard Louis Frey (May 10, 1914 – August 16, 2007) was an American prelate of the Roman Catholic Church. He served as the bishop of the Diocese of Savannah in Georgia (1967–1972) and the Diocese of Lafayette in Louisiana (1972–1989).

Biography

Early life and education
One of nine children, Gerard Frey was born on May 10, 1914, in New Orleans, Louisiana, to Andrew Francis and Marie Theresa (née DeRose) Frey. Two of his brothers also entered the priesthood. After attending St. Vincent de Paul School, Frey studied at St. Joseph College Seminary in Saint Benedict, Louisiana, from 1928 to 1932. He then entered Notre Dame Seminary in New Orleans, where he completed his theological studies.

Ordination and ministry
Frey was ordained a priest by Archbishop Joseph Rummel for the Archdiocese of New Orleans on April 2, 1938. He then served as a curate at Holy Rosary Parish in Taft, Louisiana, until 1946, when he became director of the archdiocesan Confraternity of Christian Doctrine. While serving as director, he resided at St. Leo the Great Church in New Orleans.

Frey was named a papal chamberlain by Pope Pius XII in 1949, and was appointed pastor of St. Frances Cabrini Parish at New Orleans in 1952. He was named a domestic prelate by the Vatican in 1954. Frey attended the Second Vatican Council in Rome from 1962 to 1965 as a pastoral representative. He was later made pastor of St. Francis de Sales Parish in Houma, Louisiana.

Bishop of Savannah
On May 31, 1967, Frey was appointed the eleventh bishop of the Diocese of Savannah by Pope Paul VI. He received his episcopal consecration on August 8, 1967, from Archbishop Philip Hannan, with Bishops Charles Greco and Robert Tracy serving as co-consecrators. He selected as his episcopal motto: Serviam (Latin: "I will serve").

During his tenure, Frey launched the Social Apostolate, a social service agency designed "to put people in the pews in touch with the poor." He also encouraged every church in the diocese to establish a parish council.

Bishop of Lafayette in Louisiana
On November 7, 1972, Frey was appointed the third bishop of the Diocese of Lafayette in Louisiana by Paul VI. During his tenure, he initiated reorganization plans that increased and expanded participation by clergy, religious, and laity in diocesan affairs. He also named the first woman to serve as chancellor of a Catholic diocese in the United States. In 1987, he opened a diocesan synod.

Frey was the bishop of Lafayette when the diocese and the Catholic Church faced the first wave of civil suits seeking compensation and treatment for abused children. In a legal deposition, Frey admitted to confronting Gilbert Gauthe, a diocesan priest, about sexual abuse accusations in 1974.  According to Frey, Gauthe admitted being guilty of "imprudent touches" with a boy and promised that it was an isolated instance that would not recur.  In 1975, Frey appointed Gauthe as chaplain of the diocesan Boy Scouts troop. Gauthe later confessed to sexually abusing 37 children, though he pleaded not guilty to criminal charges by reason of insanity.  Gauthe was ultimately criminally convicted in the first sex-abuse case against the Catholic Church.

Retirement and death
Pope John Paul II accepted Frey's resignation as bishop of the Diocese of Lafayette on May 13, 1989. He was succeeded by his coadjutor bishop, Harry Flynn. Frey retired to a family compound in Bay St. Louis, Mississippi, which was heavily damaged by Hurricane Katrina in 2005. His brother Jerome drove to Bay St. Louis to rescue Frey, returning him to Louisiana.

Frey spent the remainder of his life first at Consolata Nursing Home in New Iberia, Louisiana, and later in a private home in Lafayette provided by the diocese. Gerard Frey died after a lengthy illness on August 16, 2007, at age 93. He is buried in the crypt of the Cathedral of Saint John the Evangelist in Lafayette.

See also

 Catholic Church hierarchy
 Catholic Church in the United States
 Historical list of the Catholic bishops of the United States
 List of Catholic bishops of the United States
 Lists of patriarchs, archbishops, and bishops

References

External links
Roman Catholic Diocese of Lafayette
Roman Catholic Diocese of Savannah

1914 births
2007 deaths
People from New Orleans
Notre Dame Seminary alumni
Participants in the Second Vatican Council
Roman Catholic bishops of Savannah, Georgia
Catholics from Louisiana
20th-century Roman Catholic bishops in the United States